Are is a small borough in Tori Parish, Pärnu County, southwestern Estonia. Are has a population of 440.

References

External links
Are Parish 

Boroughs and small boroughs in Estonia